Barburrito is a British chain of Mexican style fast food restaurants, focusing primarily on burritos.

Barburrito was founded by Morgan Davies and Paul Kilpatrick in 2005, with its first store opening in Piccadilly Gardens in Manchester. In April 2010, the chain was operating stores in Deansgate in Manchester and Liverpool. In 2012, the company had sales of £5 million. 

Barburrito received an investment of £3.25 million from the Business Growth Fund to expand to a number of different locations, including locations in London which would become the chain's first stores outside the North West. In June 2013, the chain opened two stores in London at Paddington Station and Cowcross Street.

References

External links 
 

Fast-food chains of the United Kingdom
Fast-food Mexican restaurants
Mexican restaurants